Geckolepis humbloti, commonly known as the Comoran fish scale gecko, is a nocturnal species of lizard in the family Gekkonidae. It is endemic to Grande Comore in the Comoros. 

Originally described in 1887, this species was synonymized with Geckolepis maculata in 1942. It was later resurrected in 2015, following various subsequent scientific studies and expeditions. Hawlitschek et al. (2015) resurrected G. humbloti when it was determined to be paraphyletic based on DNA data, separating the species from G. maculata once again. 
 

Like the rest of its genus, G. humbloti sheds it's skin and scales as a defensive measure, just as many other geckos will shed their tails. These scales typically grow back over the course of several months.

References 

Geckolepis
Reptiles described in 1887